In the FIFA Women's World Cup, the following female players have been named in the national team in at least four finals tournaments.

Tournaments

Matches
The following players earned caps in at least 18 matches, which requires appearances at a minimum of three World Cup tournaments.

See also
List of players who have appeared in multiple FIFA World Cups

References

Apps
FIFA Women's World Cup-related lists
Association football player non-biographical articles